The 2011 Triple J Hottest 100 was announced on Australia Day 26 January 2012. It is the nineteenth countdown of the most popular songs of the year, as chosen by the listeners of Australian radio station Triple J.

Voting commenced on 14 December 2011, and closed on 16 January 2012.
A separate poll for the most popular album of the year was held in late November and early December 2011, with Making Mirrors by Gotye being voted the most popular album of the year. 

On 8 February 2012, Triple J announced the tracks voted #101 to #200

Full list

Artists with multiple entries

Four
The Wombats (18, 24, 26, 94)
Kimbra (Three times solo and once with Gotye) (1, 25, 52, 93)

Three
Gotye (1, 34, 87)
Boy & Bear (4, 49, 50)
360 (8, 37, 84)
Florence and the Machine (13, 36, 42)
Foster the People (14, 15, 40)
Grouplove (16, 43, 95)
Bon Iver (53, 66, 69)
Skrillex (two original and one remix) (21, 39, 73)

Two
Calvin Harris (11, 30)
Architecture in Helsinki (12, 55)
Seeker Lover Keeper (17, 86)
Example (27, 75)
Owl Eyes (28, 64)
Drapht (29, 74)
Ball Park Music (31, 38)
Jay-Z & Kanye West (33, 98)
The Strokes (41, 96)
Sparkadia (47, 56)
Foo Fighters (63, 97)
Little Dragon (One original and one collaboration with SBTRKT) (79, 82)

Countries represented
Australia – 44
United States – 26
United Kingdom – 25
New Zealand – 4
Sweden – 3
Canada – 1
France – 1
Italy – 1
Norway – 1

Notes 
 "Somebody That I Used to Know" became the first collaboration between separate artists to top the Hottest 100.
 For the second consecutive year and the third time ever, the #1 song featured a female vocalist. This was also the second consecutive year the #1 song was a duet between a male and a female artist.
 Kimbra became the first New Zealand artist to feature in the #1 song of a Hottest 100.
 The original version by Arcade Fire of the #100 song, "The Suburbs", was the #58 song in the previous year's Hottest 100. Similarly, Owl Eyes' cover of "Pumped Up Kicks" was #28, four places higher than what the original version by Foster the People could manage the previous year.
 For the third year in a row an artist from Triple J Unearthed got in the Top 10. This year it was Boy & Bear, San Cisco and The Jezabels. Also, the 2010 and 2011 Unearthed High winners (Stonefield and Snakadaktal) both made their first appearances in the Hottest 100. This is the first time this has been done.
 Producer Francois Tetaz helped write, produce and mix eight songs that charted in the countdown. The songs he helped write/produce/mix were all the songs by Architecture in Helsinki, Kimbra and Gotye.
 This is the first countdown since 1995 not to feature any previous Hottest 100 winners.

Top 20 Albums of 2011

This edition was hosted by Triple J presenter Caroline Tran, instead of regular presenter Richard Kingsmill. It was broadcast on 11 December, the final show of "2011" for 2011. It was announced that Making Mirrors won by an unprecedented margin.

Voting was held from 25 November right until the day before the countdown (10 December).

Bold indicates winner of the 2011 J Award and Hottest 100.

Notes 
 For the second year in a row the ARIA album of the year comes 3rd in the Triple J Album Poll.
 Gotye is the first J Award winner since Wolfmother in 2005 to win the Triple J Album Poll. He is also the first artist to win the Triple J Album Poll twice.
 Cut Copy are the first band since Bloc Party in 2008 to get in the Top 20 Album Poll and not feature in the Hottest 100.

CD release 

For the first time ever the Hottest 100 CD was released digitally on iTunes

DVD
 Gotye Featuring Kimbra - "Somebody That I Used to Know"
 The Black Keys - "Lonely Boy"
 Matt Corby - "Brother" (Live)
 Boy & Bear - "Feeding Line"
 M83 - "Midnight City"
 San Cisco - "Awkward"
 360 featuring Gossling - "Boys Like You"
 The Jezabels - "Endless Summer"
 Hilltop Hoods Featuring Sia - "I Love It"
 Calvin Harris - "Feel So Close"
 Architecture in Helsinki - "Contact High"
 Florence and the Machine - "Shake It Out"
 Foster the People - "Helena Beat"
 Grouplove - Tongue Tied
 Seeker Lover Keeper - "Even Though I'm a Woman"
 The Wombats - "Jump Into the Fog"
 Nero - "Promises"
 Bluejuice - "Act Yr Age"
 Snakadaktal - "Air"
 Emma Louise - "Jungle"
 Kimbra - "Cameo Lover"
 Example - "Changed the Way You Kissed Me"
 Drapht - "Sing It (The Life of Riley)"
 Ball Park Music - "It's Nice to Be Alive"
 Noah and the Whale - "L.I.F.E.G.O.E.S.O.N."
 Illy - "Cigarettes"
 Benny Benassi featuring Gary Go - "Cinema" (Skrillex Remix)
 Hermitude - "Speak of the Devil"
 The Kooks - "Junk of the Heart (Happy)"
 Active Child - "Hangin' On"
 Sparkadia - "Mary"
 Art vs. Science - "A.I.M. Fire!"
 The Drums - "Money"
 The Grates - "Turn Me On"
 Lykke Li - "I Follow Rivers"
 Joe Goddard featuring Valentina - "Gabriel"
 Stonefield - "Black Water Rising"
 Owl Eyes - "Raiders"
 Kasabian - "Re-Wired"
 Arctic Monkeys - "Don't Sit Down 'Cause I've Moved Your Chair"
 Jebediah - "She's Like a Comet"
 Husky - "History's Door"
 Pnau - "The Truth"
 Bubsy Marou - "Biding My Time"
 City and Colour - "Fragile Bird"

References

2011 in Australian music
Australia Triple J
2011